Carlos Barrera e Sánchez (3 December 1950 – 7 April 2022) was a Spanish Aranese politician. A member of the Aranese Democratic Convergence, he served as Síndic d'Aran from 1995 to 2007 and again from 2011 to 2019. 

He died in Vielha on 7 April 2022 at the age of 71.

References

1950 births
2022 deaths
Síndics d'Aran
Aranese Democratic Convergence politicians
Aranese politicians
20th-century Spanish politicians
21st-century Spanish politicians
People from the Province of Lleida